The 2021–22 Campionato Sammarinese di Calcio was the 37th season of league competition in San Marino, in which the country's top 15 amateur football teams competed. The season began on 18 September 2021 and ended on 26 May 2022. The winners of the league, La Fiorita qualified for a place in the 2022–23 UEFA Champions League. Runners-up, Tre Penne qualified for a place in the 2022–23 UEFA Europa Conference League.

Folgore were the defending champions after winning the title in the previous season, but failed to defend their title as Fiorentino knocked them out in the play-offs. La Fiorita won their sixth title by defeating Tre Penne in the final, 2–0.

Participating teams
Because there is no promotion or relegation in the league, the same 15 teams who competed in the league the previous season competed in the league again this season.

 Cailungo (Borgo Maggiore)
 Cosmos (Serravalle)
 Domagnano (Domagnano)
 Faetano (Faetano)
 Fiorentino (Fiorentino)
 Folgore (Serravalle)
 Juvenes/Dogana (Serravalle)
 La Fiorita (Montegiardino)
 Libertas (Borgo Maggiore)
 Murata (San Marino)
 Pennarossa (Chiesanuova)
 San Giovanni (Borgo Maggiore)
 Tre Fiori (Fiorentino)
 Tre Penne (Serravalle)
 Virtus (Acquaviva)

First phase
The regular season was contested by fifteen teams who played each other twice. Eight teams advanced to the second phase. The top four teams at the end of the first phase advanced to the second phase and the next eight teams played for the other four spots in the second phase.

League table

Results

Second phase

Play–offs
The play–offs were played on 3 & 7 May 2022 between the teams finishing fifth to twelfth in the first phase. If teams are even after two legs, the team with the better first phase record will advance.

|}

Quarter–finals
The quarter–finals were played on 11 & 15 May 2022 by the top four teams from the first phase and the four play–off winners.

|}

Semi–finals
The semi–finals were played on 18 & 22 May 2022 by the four quarter-finals winners.

|}

Third place match
Tre Fiori qualified to the 2022–23 UEFA Europa Conference League via winning the 2021–22 Coppa Titano, therefore this game did not act as a qualifier.

Final
La Fiorita qualified as the winner to the 2022–23 UEFA Champions League and Tre Penne as the loser to the 2022–23 UEFA Europa Conference League.

References

External links
 

Campionato Sammarinese di Calcio
San Marino
Campionato Sammarinese di Calcio